Since 2021, Ecuador has suffered a security crisis resulting from conflicts between criminal organizations with connections to drug trafficking. The conflicts began after the murder of Jorge Luis Zambrano, leader of the criminal syndicate Los Choneros, considered one of the oldest and most dangerous in the country. Zambrano was murdered on 28 December 2020 and his death led to the criminal groups known as Los Chone Killers, Los Lobos, Los Pipos and Los Tiguerones, which functioned as substructures of Los Choneros, to separate from the gang and start a war against its former leaders for control of the country's prisons and drug trafficking through a series of massacres and other criminal acts.

The wave of violence has generated a sharp rise in the number of murders in the country. In 2021, the intentional homicide rate reached 14.04 per 100,000 people (the highest since 2011), compared to a rate of 7.8 in 2020. These figures have continued to increase in 2022 The most violent areas in the country includes the cantons of Guayaquil, Durán and Samborondón. It saw 53 murders between January and February 2021 and 162 in the same period in 2022.

The focus of the violence has developed within the prisons of the country, with events such as the February 2021 Ecuadorian prison riots and the September 2021 Guayaquil prison riot, both of which occurred in 2021 and the second considered one of the bloodiest prison massacres in Latin American history. In total, 503 inmates were murdered in the country during 2021 alone. However, the wave of violence has also manifested itself outside prisons. This has been reflected in citizen perception, as shown by a survey carried out by the firm Click Research in October 2021, which indicated that crime was considered by the citizens as the biggest problem that the country was going through.

Chronology of events

2021

February

February 23: The February 2021 Ecuadorian prison riots on 23 February 2021, which left 79 inmates murdered, took place simultaneously at Turi Prison, Litoral Penitentiary and the regional prisons of Latacunga and Guayas. The massacre was perpetrated by members of Los Chone Killers, Los Lobos, Los Pipos and Los Tiguerones against Los Choneros, an organization of which they separated from.

March
5 March: Government minister, Patricio Pazmiño, resigns from office.
31 March: During a police operation in Guayaquil, five members of Los Choneros gang were arrested.

April
28 April: Clashes between members of Los Choneros and Los Lobos at Litoral Penitentiary left five prisoners dead and twelve injured.

May
29 May: The leader of Los Chone Killers, known as Ben10, was released after the prosecutor handling his case refrained from charging him.

June
4 June: During a police operation in different sectors of Guayaquil, fourteen members of Los Choneros were captured.
8 June: Two fishing boats are attacked with explosives and set on fire in Posorja, a rural parish of Guayaquil. At least one of them would have been owned by a leader of Los Choneros.
13 June: Clashes between gangs took place at Litoral Penitentiary, leaving one dead and six injured.

July
21 July: Simultaneous massacres took place at Litoral Penitentiary and Latacunga Regional Prison. The events left 27 inmates murdered. In the case of Litoral, the clashes had started after members of Los Choneros attacked Los Lobos, which caused them to murder inmates who worked in the prison garden and who were supposedly allies of Los Choneros. This in turn unleashed the clashes in Latacunga.
22 July: As a result of the massacre that occurred the day before, President Guillermo Lasso dismisses Edmundo Moncayo, director of the National Service for Comprehensive Attention to Persons Deprived of Liberty (SNAI). Fausto Cobo was appointed in his place.

September
13 September: A drone attack took place at Guayas Regional Prison. The devices generated explosions in the prison center in an attempt to assassinate Adolfo Macías and Júnior Roldán, leaders of Los Choneros.
27 September: Fausto Cobo leaves his post as director of the SNAI after Lasso appointed him director of the Center for Strategic Intelligence. In his place Bolívar Garzón Espinosa was appointed.

28 September: The September 2021 Guayaquil prison riot occurred. It left 123 inmates murdered, 23 which made it the deadliest prison massacre in the history of the country and one of the deadliest in Latin American history.

October
14 October: Four inmates were found hanged at Litoral Penitentiary.
22 October: Olympic sprinter Álex Quiñónez was shot to death in a deliberate attack by hit men in the Colinas de la Florida sector of northern Guayaquil.
23 October: Seven inmates were found hanged at Litoral Penitentiary.
28 October: Lasso declares a 60-day state of emergency to deal with the security crisis. The emergency allowed the military to go out to patrol the main cities.

November
2 November: A shootout occurs at Litoral Penitentiary that leaves three prisoners dead.
6 November: During a police operation in Machala, five members of Los Lobos gang were arrested.
10 November: 
Álex Salazar, leader of Los Tiguerones, was released from Litoral Penitentiary after serving 60% of his sentence.
After Salazar was released, clashes broke out at Litoral Penitentiary, leaving three dead.
12 November:
Three inmates who had escaped from Litoral Penitentiary were captured at dawn when they tried to re-enter the prison center bringing an arsenal of rifles, ammunition, grenades and dynamite.
The November 2021 Guayaquil prison riot occurred. It left 65 inmates murdered and began when members of Los Choneros attacked pavilion 2 of the penitentiary, which was under the control of Los Chone Killers. While Los Choneros focused their attacks against pavilion 2, inmates from the other pavilions attacked the transitory area of the penitentiary, which ended up being the place where the greatest number of murders took place.
14 November: Bolívar Garzón Espinosa, director of the National Service for Comprehensive Attention to Persons Deprived of Liberty (SNAI), submits his resignation. President Lasso temporarily entrusts the position to Fausto Cobo.
17 November: Michelle Macías, daughter of Adolfo Macías, who was one of the leaders of Los Choneros, was kidnapped in Manta along with a classmate after leaving class. Four days later, she was rescued by the National Anti-Kidnapping and Extortion Investigation Unit.

December
8 December: Lasso appoints Pablo Ramírez as the new director of the National Comprehensive Care Service for Persons Deprived of Liberty (SNAI).
16 December: Lasso signs an executive decree by which he creates a Commission for Penitentiary Dialogue and Pacification.

2022

January
21 January: A massacre occurred in the Playita del Guasmo sector of southern Guayaquil, after 15 subjects arrived in boats and shot at people who were in a sports field. The incident left 5 dead and 9 injured.
23 January: General Tannya Varela, Commander General of the National Police, was removed from office by President Guillermo Lasso. Her successor was General Carlos Fernando Cabrera.

February
1 February: A shooting took place at the Coop Unión de Bananeros, leaving one person dead and 4 wounded.
4 February: Simultaneous raids in the cities of Guayaquil, Quito, Quevedo and Samborondón lead to the capture of ten members of Los Lobos.
11 February: A new shooting occurred in the Playita del Guasmo sector of southern Guayaquil. The incident left four dead and one injured.
14 February: Two corpses were found hanging from a pedestrian bridge in Durán. Both victims had criminal records for drug trafficking.
20 February: A 21-year-old man was abandoned by unknown persons next to his home, in northern Guayaquil, with an explosive device tied to his head, it exploded moments later and scattered his remains in a radius of 30 meters.

March
6 March: Seven people were killed and three injured after an attack by hit men in the Las Malvinas sector of southern Guayaquil.
11 March: During a police operation in Quevedo, four members Los Choneros were arrested, including one of its leaders.
24 March: A massacre occurred at the Eclipse nightclub in Esmeraldas. The incident left five people dead and nine injured. Members of Los Tiguerones and Los Gangsters were involved in the event.

References

2021 murders in Ecuador
2022 murders in Ecuador
2021 crimes in Ecuador
2022 crimes in Ecuador